Leptospermum brevipes, commonly known as the slender tea-tree, is a species of shrub or small tree that is endemic to eastern Australia. It has fibrous bark on the main stems, smooth bark on young stems, narrow elliptical to narrow egg-shaped leaves, white flowers and hemispherical fruit that is shed when mature.

Description
The bark on its larger stems is rough but young stems have smooth bark that is shed in stringy strips and have a flange near the base of the petiole. Flowering occurs from October to December and the fruit is a silky-hairy, hemispherical capsule  in diameter with the sepals attached and that is shed when mature.

Taxonomy and naming
Leptospermum brevipes was first formally described in 1855 by Ferdinand von Mueller in his book Definitions of rare or hitherto undescribed Australian plants. The specific epithet (brevipes) is a Latin word meaning "short-footed".

Distribution and habitat
Slender tea-tree grows in woodland and shrubland, usually on rocky granite outcrops and near rocky streams. It occurs from the Granite Belt in south-eastern Queensland, mostly along the tablelands of New South Wales and the Australian Capital Territory to eastern Victoria.

References

brevipes
Myrtales of Australia
Flora of New South Wales
Flora of Queensland
Flora of Victoria (Australia)
Plants described in 1855
Taxa named by Ferdinand von Mueller